Wat Doi Mae Pang is a Buddhist temple in Phrao district, Chiang Mai Province, northern Thailand. It is some 75 kilometres from the city Chiang Mai on route 1001 towards Phrao.

Local legends say that the road 1001 was built due to Luang Por Waen Sujinno. Legend tells of this monk meditating and floating hundreds of feet into the air. He was seen by helicopter by the King (some say a soldier not a King) and the King was so astonished he realized a road must built to this holy place as well as Phrao. The locals have variations of this tale but any tourists in the area will hear this as the reason for Road 1001 being built.

Its greatest claim to fame is that it was the home to Luang Por Waen Sujinno, a famous and revered monk, from 1962 until his death in 1985. Many of the buildings are of wooden construction, including the viharn and a hermit's cell called Rong Yang Giled or Rong Fai. Relics of Luang Por Waen Sujinno include his dwelling hut, a picture in the pavilion that shows him meditating, and a square-shaped, spire-roofed museum with his ashes, a wax model of the monk, and his person effects.

Doi Mae Pang